Deokso Station is a train station on the Gyeongui-Jungang Line, South Korea. It was the eastern terminus of the Jungang Line commuter rail system prior to the opening of Paldang Station, and some trains still travel up to this station, before heading back to Yongsan.

Deokso Station is located in Deokso, a town east of Seoul and on the north bank of the Han River.

External links
 Station information from Korail

Seoul Metropolitan Subway stations
Railway stations opened in 1939
Metro stations in Namyangju
Railway stations in Gyeonggi Province